Events from the year 1727 in Denmark.

Incumbents
 Monarch – Frederick IV
 Grand Chancellor – Ulrik Adolf Holstein

Events
 Foundation of the Det Kongelige Vajsenhus.

Undated

Births
 December 1 – Frederik Christian Kaas, Admiral, landowner (died 1804)

Deaths

References

 
1720s in Denmark
Denmark
Years of the 18th century in Denmark